The Anglican Diocese of Osun is one of 17 within the Anglican Province of Ibadan, itself one of 14 provinces within the Church of Nigeria. The bishop emeritus is James Afolabi Popoola and the current bishop is Foluso Olugbenga Babatunji.

The Diocese of Osun was inaugurated on 3  August 1987, and Seth Oni Fagbemi was enthroned at All Saints’ Cathedral, Balogun, Osogbo, as the pioneer bishop.

Bishops

Notes

Church of Nigeria dioceses
Dioceses of the Province of Ibadan